SBG may refer to:

Businesses and organisations
 SlowBoy Garage (SBG), a automotive YouTube channel 
 Sabre Corporation (ICAO: SBG)
 Saudi Binladin Group, a construction group
 Savage Bingham and Garfield Railroad, a common carrier freight railroad in the U.S.
 Scottish Bus Group
 Shenzhen Bus Group, a franchised bus service operator in Shenzhen, China
 Sinclair Broadcast Group, U.S.
 Skye Bank Guinée, a bank in Guinea
 Straight Blast Gym - Ireland
 Union Bank of Switzerland, (German: Schweizerische Bankgesellschaft)
 SBG a secret Iranian academy at Bums university, Birjand, South Khorasan
 Sweet Baby Gang

Places
 Maimun Saleh Airport (IATA: SBG), in Sabang, Pulau Weh, Indonesia
 Sebring station (station code: SBG), Sebring, Florida, U.S.

Other uses 
 Siba Giba, French-American record producer
 Seget language (ISO 639-3: sbg), spoken in Indonesia
 Sebat Bet Gurage, the parent language to Chaha, spoken in Ethiopia
 Server-based gaming
 Small Box Girder, a small assault bridge
 Star for Bravery in Gold, a South African military award

See also
 
 
 SBGS (disambiguation)